In mathematics, the Ornstein–Uhlenbeck operator is a generalization of the Laplace operator to an infinite-dimensional setting. The Ornstein–Uhlenbeck operator plays a significant role in the Malliavin calculus.

Introduction: the finite-dimensional picture

The Laplacian

Consider the gradient operator ∇ acting on scalar functions f : Rn → R; the gradient of a scalar function is a vector field v = ∇f : Rn → Rn. The divergence operator div, acting on vector fields to produce scalar fields, is the adjoint operator to ∇. The Laplace operator Δ is then the composition of the divergence and gradient operators:

,

acting on scalar functions to produce scalar functions. Note that A = −Δ is a positive operator, whereas Δ is a dissipative operator.

Using spectral theory, one can define a square root (1 − Δ)1/2 for the operator (1 − Δ). This square root satisfies the following relation involving the Sobolev H1-norm and L2-norm for suitable scalar functions f:

The Ornstein–Uhlenbeck operator

Often, when working on Rn, one works with respect to Lebesgue measure, which has many nice properties.  However, remember that the aim is to work in infinite-dimensional spaces, and it is a fact that there is no infinite-dimensional Lebesgue measure.  Instead, if one is studying some separable Banach space E, what does make sense is a notion of Gaussian measure;  in particular, the abstract Wiener space construction makes sense.

To get some intuition about what can be expected in the infinite-dimensional setting, consider standard Gaussian measure γn on Rn:  for Borel subsets A of Rn,

This makes (Rn, B(Rn), γn) into a probability space;  E will denote expectation with respect to γn.

The gradient operator ∇ acts on a (differentiable) function φ : Rn → R to give a vector field ∇φ : Rn → Rn.

The divergence operator δ (to be more precise, δn, since it depends on the dimension) is now defined to be the adjoint of ∇ in the Hilbert space sense, in the Hilbert space L2(Rn, B(Rn), γn; R).  In other words, δ acts on a vector field v : Rn → Rn to give a scalar function δv : Rn → R, and satisfies the formula

On the left, the product is the pointwise Euclidean dot product of two vector fields;  on the right, it is just the pointwise multiplication of two functions.  Using integration by parts, one can check that δ acts on a vector field v with components vi, i = 1, ..., n, as follows:

The change of notation from "div" to "δ" is for two reasons:  first, δ is the notation used in infinite dimensions (the Malliavin calculus);  secondly, δ is really the negative of the usual divergence.

The (finite-dimensional) Ornstein–Uhlenbeck operator L (or, to be more precise, Lm) is defined by

with the useful formula that for any f and g smooth enough for all the terms to make sense,

The Ornstein–Uhlenbeck operator L is related to the usual Laplacian Δ by

The Ornstein–Uhlenbeck operator for a separable Banach space

Consider now an abstract Wiener space E with Cameron-Martin Hilbert space H and Wiener measure γ. Let D denote the Malliavin derivative. The Malliavin derivative D is an unbounded operator from L2(E, γ; R) into L2(E, γ; H) – in some sense, it measures "how random" a function on E is.

Again, δ is defined to be the adjoint of the gradient operator (in this case, the Malliavin derivative is playing the role of the gradient operator). The operator δ is also known the Skorokhod integral, which is an anticipating stochastic integral;  it is this set-up that gives rise to the slogan "stochastic integrals are divergences".  δ satisfies the identity

Then the Ornstein–Uhlenbeck operator for E is the operator L defined by

References

  
 

Operator theory
Stochastic calculus